Annexin A11 is a protein that in humans is encoded by the ANXA11 gene.

Function 

This gene encodes a member of the annexin family, a group of calcium-dependent phospholipid-binding proteins. Annexins have unique N-terminal domains and conserved C-terminal domains, which contain the calcium-dependent phospholipid-binding sites. The encoded protein is a 56-kD antigen recognized by sera from patients with various autoimmune diseases. Transcript variants encoding the same isoform have been identified.

Interactions 

ANXA11 has been shown to interact with PDCD6 and ALG2.

Clinical significance 

It is shown that over-expression of the ANXA11 is involved in apoptotic alterations in schizophrenia and contribute to pathomechanisms of this disorder.

References

External links

Further reading